The Humber-Lune Line is a term used for the traditional dialect boundary in England between descendants of Northumbrian Old English to the north & Mercian Old English to the south. It is considered the most significant dialect boundary within the Anglic dialect continuum and separates the Scots language alongside the Northumbrian, Cumbrian, North Riding and East Riding dialects from all other Anglic varieties. The line, though not specific, trends from south-east to north-west, from the Humber estuary to the mouth of the Cumbrian River Lune west of Lancaster.{{refn|This article is founded on the Cumbrian River Lune, not to be confused with the River Lune, Durham located nearby in County Durham.|group=Note}}

Within the last century the line has moved northwards to the Tees. Traditional Northumbrian dialects (in the broadest sense of the word) are now essentially extinct in Yorkshire, spoken only by some older speakers in the Yorkshire Dales. However, Northumbrian dialects are still spoken by younger speakers in Northumberland, Durham, and Cumberland, especially in areas around the Scottish Border.

 In-depth description 
Traditional Northern English dialects spoken north of the line, alongside the closely related Scots language, appear highly divergent and underwent markedly different paths of development from all other Anglic dialects. Primarily, differences in the development of early ME /uː/, early ME /oː/, and OE /ɑː/, the development of early ME short /o/ and short /e/ when subject to Open Syllable Lengthening, and the lengthening of OE short /u/ and /i/ before clusters of homorganic nasal plus stop, and the development of OE short /a/ before [ng] took radically different paths of development on either side of the line. Traditional Northern or Scots dialects, therefore, have  [kuː] for cow,  [grʊnd] for ground,  [ɹaŋ] for wrong, and  [sten] (Scots) or styen/steean'' [stɪən] (Northern) for stone.

Notes

References 

Isoglosses
English language in England